Altered States of America is a 100-song 3" mini CD and the third studio album released by grindcore band Agoraphobic Nosebleed. The album's songs cover a variety of topics, with many referring to violence and drug use. Several songs consist solely of a vocal delivery of the title on top of noise, such as "The Tokyo Subway Gassing" and "The Star of David". The album is divided into movements, some of which are titled. "Wonder Drug Wonderland", which is credited as track 00, can be found on the CD by holding rewind at the start of track 1; it is the first song on the LP. The cover art was created by Jeff Gaither.

In late 2008, Altered States of America was re-issued as a two disc set with the second disc, titled ANbRx II: Delta 9, consisting of remixes from Chicago industrial/hardcore artist Delta 9. The song titles on the remix disc were inspired by the Merzbow/Gore Beyond Necropsy collaboration Rectal Anarchy.

Track listing

ANbRx II: Delta 9

References

2003 albums
Agoraphobic Nosebleed albums